The 1942–43 La Liga was the 12th season since its establishment. Athletic Bilbao achieved their fifth title.

Team locations

League table

Results

Relegation play-offs
Match between Español and Real Gijón was played at Estadio Chamartín in Chamartín de la Rosa, while the other one was held at Camp de Les Corts, Barcelona.

|}

Top scorers

External links
LFP website

1942 1943
1942–43 in Spanish football leagues
Spain